Fair Chain aims to establish a more equitable distribution of returns in a production chain. For many products, the exporting country or farmer receives a disproportionate percentage of the retail price relative to the seller. In turn, fair chain extends beyond fair trade by focusing on supply chain integration in addition to pricing.

In 2012, the fair chain principles were first developed by Dutch-born entrepreneur Guido van Staveren van Dijk when he founded Moyee Coffee, a Dutch-Ethiopian company. Moyee applies the fair chain concept in coffee production by roasting, mixing and packaging beans in the country of origin, instead of in Europe or the United States as is standard practice. This business model helps retain more added value in the producing country and fits into the idea of creating shared value. Moyee directly aligns its economic and social interests by:
 paying a large premium on the local price for beans
 roasting locally, in a joint venture with local partners who invest in improving the agricultural and living conditions
 allocating profits to fund social projects that reinforce the fair chain principles

Other initiatives considered to operate according to fair chain principles include Escoffee in Ecuador and Azahar Coffee in Colombia ("Value Added at Source").

References
Schalekamp, M. (2012) Max Havelaar, 2.0, NRC Handelsblad. 30 November 2012,
Porter, M.E. en Kramer M.R. (2011) "Creating Shared Value", Harvard Business Review, January 2011

Fair trade